Michael Fimognari (born June 26, 1974) is an American cinematographer and director known for his collaborations with Mike Flanagan. He was born in Pittsburgh, Pennsylvania, and graduated from Pennsylvania State University before receiving a master's degree in cinematography from the USC School of Cinematic Arts in 2002.

Filmography

Feature film

Web series

Television

References

External links
 
 Official Website

American cinematographers
People from Pittsburgh
Living people
1974 births
USC School of Cinematic Arts alumni